The 47th ceremony of the Annie Awards, honoring excellence in the field of animation for the year of 2019, took place on January 25, 2020, at the University of California, Los Angeles's Royce Hall in Los Angeles, California, in 37 categories.

Productions Categories
On December 2, 2019, the nominations were announced. Frozen II and Missing Link earned the most number of nominations with 8, followed by Klaus with 7, which won all of the awards for which it was nominated.

Individual achievement categories

Multiple awards and nominations

Films

The following films received multiple nominations:

The following films received multiple awards:

Television/Broadcast 
The following shows received multiple nominations:

The following shows received multiple awards:

References

External links
 Complete list of 47th Annual Annie Awards nominees

2019
Annie
Annie
Annie